Püggen is a village and a former municipality in the district Altmarkkreis Salzwedel, in Saxony-Anhalt, Germany. Since 1 July 2009, it is part of the municipality Kuhfelde.

Former municipalities in Saxony-Anhalt
Altmarkkreis Salzwedel